Walter Schreifels (born March 10, 1969) is an American rock musician and producer from New York City.

Career 
In the late 1980s, he played in many New York hardcore bands, most notably Youth of Today and Gorilla Biscuits, where he was also the songwriter and lyricist. After Gorilla Biscuits broke up, he formed the short-lived Moondog. In October 2006, the band's self-titled EP was officially released for the first time ever on Anthology Recordings. It was previously available only as a bootleg 7" record. Moondog would transition into the more metal-oriented post-hardcore band Quicksand. He also collaborated with his former Gorilla Biscuits bandmates in the melodic hardcore band CIV, writing much of their first LP and one song on their follow-up LP despite not actually playing on the record. He went on to start World's Fastest Car, a relatively short-lived project. The band recorded a demo and an EP, neither of which have been officially released. The EP was supposed to be released by Revelation Records, but that never came to fruition due to their breakup. Later, he helped create the melodic indie rock-styled band Rival Schools. After Rival Schools' dissolution, he went on to form Walter and the Motorcycles, who recorded but never released a self-titled LP and played a few shows but quickly broke up. Walking Concert, his next project, was heavily influenced by classic British acts such as Elvis Costello, The Kinks, Syd Barrett, David Bowie and The Smiths. In addition to a new solo acoustic LP scheduled for release in 2008, Schreifels reformed Rival Schools in June 2008 with plans to release a new album. In October 2009, he appeared on "Memoria : A Tribute to the Alternative 90s" (Yr Letter Records) with "When You Sleep", a My Bloody Valentine cover. In 2014, Schreifels joined a blues rock band that would come to be known as Dead Heavens.

On November 16, 2010, Rival Schools released the deluxe single for "Shot After Shot" on iTunes from the forthcoming record Pedals, which was released in March 2011.

As a producer, he has worked with such hardcore-related bands as Hot Water Music, Sinch , The First Step and Title Fight. He produced the EP Deer Strutter, the first from the UK band Cars As Weapons, and a full length titled Days Above Ground from Australian post-hardcore band, Paper Arms. He is also part owner of the record label Some Records. He produced hardcore/pop punk act Title Fight's first full length titled Shed.

Solo 
On May 4, 2010, Schreifels released his first solo album, An Open Letter to the Scene on Big Scary Monsters Recording Company (UK), Academy Fight Song (U.S.), Dine Alone Records (Canada) and Arctic Rodeo (Europe). In support of the album release, Schreifels announced a 12-date UK tour. The album features 10 tracks on CD and 11 on vinyl, including covers of songs by Agnostic Front, CIV, and My Bloody Valentine (vinyl version only). The CIV song he covered, "Don't Gotta Prove It", was written by Schreifels.

In an interview with Alter The Press!, Schreifels confirmed his follow-up solo record was 85% complete and would be titled Jesus Is My Favorite Beatle.

Discography

With Gorilla Biscuits
 Gorilla Biscuits (1988, Revelation Records)
 Start Today (1989, Revelation Records)

With Youth of Today
 We're Not in This Alone (1986 Wishing Well Records/ 1988 Revelation Records)
 Disengage (1990 Revelation Records)

With Quicksand
 Quicksand (EP, 1990, Revelation Records)
 Slip (1993, Polydor)
 Manic Compression (1995, Island Records)
 Interiors (2017, Epitaph Records)
 Distant Populations (2021, Epitaph Records)

With Rival Schools
 United by Fate (2001, Island Records)
 Pedals (2011, Photo Finish Records)
 Found (2013, Shop Radio Cast)

With Walking Concert
 Run to Be Born (2004, Arctic Rodeo Recordings)

As Walter Schreifels
 An Open Letter to the Scene (2010, Arctic Rodeo Recordings)

With Vanishing Life
 Surveillance (2016, Dine Alone Records)

With Dead Heavens
 Whatever Witch You Are (2017, Dine Alone Records)

References

External links 
 Comprehensive listing of all Walter's projects
 Listing of releases, shows and flyers for Walter's solo project
 Interview with Walter Schreifels on PMAKid.com
 Walter Schreifels interview

1969 births
Living people
Alternative metal guitarists
Alternative metal musicians
American punk rock guitarists
Guitarists from New York (state)
20th-century American guitarists
CIV (band) members
Youth of Today members
Project X (band) members